Donnybrook Road is an arterial road through the northern fringes of Melbourne, linking the outer northern suburb of  to the outer northern fringe at , travelling through the suburbs of  and .

History
In 1876, a single-laned stone bridge over Kalkallo Creek at Donnybrook was built. On 11 November 2008, the grade-separated interchange with Hume Freeway at Kalkallo opened to traffic, replacing the former at-grade intersection. Works also included a new bridge over Kalkallo Creek, replacing the stone bridge from 1876.

Major intersections

|}

References

External links 

Roads in Victoria (Australia)
Streets in Melbourne
Transport in the City of Hume
Transport in the City of Whittlesea